A150 may refer to:
 A150 road (Great Britain), a designation previously allocated to a road between Wisbech and Long Sutton, England
 A150 motorway (France), a motorway north west of Rouen
 Design A-150 battleship, also known as the Super Yamato class, formerly a Japanese plan for a class of battleships